Prince of the City is a 1981 American neo-noir crime drama film directed and co-written by Sidney Lumet. The film follows Daniel Ciello, an officer of the New York Police Department who chooses, for idealistic reasons, to expose corruption in the force. Ciello, played by Treat Williams, was based on the NYPD narcotics detective Robert Leuci.

The film's large supporting cast also features Jerry Orbach, Bob Balaban, and Lindsay Crouse. The screenplay, by Lumet and Jay Presson Allen, is based on Robert Daley's 1978 book of the same name, and was nominated for an Academy Award for Best Adapted Screenplay.

Plot 
Danny Ciello is a narcotics detective who works in the Special Investigative Unit (SIU) of the New York Police Department. He and his partners are called "Princes of the City" because they are largely unsupervised and are given wide latitude to make cases against defendants. They are involved in numerous illegal practices, such as skimming money from criminals, and supplying informants with drugs.

Danny has a drug-addict brother and a cousin in organized crime. After an incident in which Danny beats up a junkie to supply another junkie with heroin, his conscience begins to bother him. He is approached by internal affairs and federal prosecutors to participate in an investigation into police corruption. In exchange for potentially avoiding prosecution and gaining federal protection for himself and his family, Ciello wears a wire and goes undercover to expose the inner workings of illegal police activity and corruption. He agrees to cooperate as long as he does not have to turn in his partners, but his past misdeeds and criminal associates come back to haunt him.

One of his partners commits suicide during interrogation, and his cousin in the Mafia, who saves Danny's life on one occasion and warns him of a contract on his life on another, winds up dead. While confessing to three crimes he committed in the 11 years he worked for the SIU, Danny perjures himself by denying the many other offenses he and his partners have committed. Despite repeatedly professing loyalty, Danny finally gives up all of his partners, one of whom shoots himself as a result of this betrayal. Most of the others turn against him. In the end, the chief government prosecutor decides not to prosecute Danny, and he returns to work as an instructor at the Police Academy.

Cast 

 Treat Williams as Daniel Ciello
 Jerry Orbach as Gus Levy
 Richard Foronjy as Joe Marinaro
 Don Billett as Bill Mayo
 Kenny Marino as Dom Bando
 Carmine Caridi as Gino Mascone
 Tony Page as Raf Alvarez
 Norman Parker as Rick Cappalino
 Paul Roebling as Brooks Paige
 Bob Balaban as Santimassino
 James Tolkan as District Attorney Polito
 Steve Inwood as Mario Vincente
 Lindsay Crouse as Carla Ciello
 Matthew Laurance as Ronnie Ciello
 Tony Turco as Socks Ciello
 Ronald Maccone as Nick Napoli (as Ron Maccone)
 Ron Karabatsos as Dave DeBennedeto
 Tony DiBenedetto as Carl Alagretti
 Tony Munafo as Rocky Gazzo
 Robert Christian as The King
 Lee Richardson as Sam Heinsdorff
 Lane Smith as Tug Barnes
 Cosmo Allegretti as Marcel Sardino
 Bobby Alto as Mr. Kanter
 Michael Beckett as Michael Blomberg
 Burton Collins as Monty
 Henry Ferrentino as Older Virginia Guard
 Carmine Foresta as Ernie Fallacci
 Conard Fowkes as Elroy Pendleton
 Peter Friedman as D.A. Goldman
 Peter Michael Goetz as Attorney Charles Deluth
 Lance Henriksen as D.A. Burano
 Eddie Jones as Ned Chippy
 Don Leslie as D.A. D'Amato
 Dana Lorge as Ann Mascone
 Harry Madsen as Bubba Harris
 E.D. Miller as Sergeant Edelman
 Cynthia Nixon as Jeannie
 Ron Perkins as Virginia Trooper
 Lionel Pina as Sancho
 José Angel Santana as José (as José Santana)
 Walter Brooke as Judge (uncredited)
 Alan King as Himself (uncredited)
 Bruce Willis as Extra (uncredited)
 Ilana Rapp as Beach Player (uncredited)

Production 
When producer and screenwriter Jay Presson Allen read Robert Daley's book Prince of the City (1978), she was convinced it was an ideal Sidney Lumet project, but the film rights had been sold to Orion Pictures for writer-director Brian De Palma and screenwriter David Rabe. Allen let it be known that if that deal should fall through, then she wanted the deal for Lumet. Just as Lumet was about to sign for a different picture, they got the call that Prince of the City was theirs.

Allen hadn't wanted to write Prince of the City, just produce it. She was put off by the book's non-linear story structure, but Lumet wouldn't make the picture without her, and agreed to write the outline for her. Lumet and Allen went over the book and agreed on what they could use and what they could do without. To her horror, Lumet would come in every day for weeks and scribble on legal pads. She was terrified that she would have to tell him that his stuff was unusable, but to her delight the outline was wonderful and she went to work. It was her first project with living subjects, and Allen interviewed nearly everyone in the book and had endless hours of Bob Leuci's tapes for back-up. With all her research and Lumet's outline, she eventually turned out a 365-page script in 10 days. It was nearly impossible to sell the studio on a three-hour picture, but by offering to slash the budget to $10 million they agreed. When asked if the original author ever has anything to say about how their book is treated, Allen replied: "Not if I can help it. You cannot open that can of worms. You sell your book, you go to the bank, you shut up."

Orion Pictures had bought Daley's book for $500,000 in 1978. Daley was a former New York Deputy Police Commissioner for Public Affairs who wrote about Robert Leuci, an NYPD detective whose testimony and secret tape recordings helped indict 52 members of the Special Investigation Unit and convict them of income tax evasion. Originally, Brian De Palma was going to direct with David Rabe adapting the book and Robert De Niro playing Leuci but the project fell through. Sidney Lumet came aboard to direct under two conditions: He did not want a big name movie star playing Leuci because he did not "want to spend two reels getting over past associations," and the movie's running time would be at least three hours.

Lumet cast Williams after spending three weeks talking to him and listening to the actor read the script and then reading it again with 50 other cast members. In order to research the role, the actor spent a month learning about police work, hung out at 23rd Precinct in New York City, went on a drug bust, and lived with Leuci for some time. By the time rehearsals started, Williams said "I was thinking like a cop." Lumet felt guilty about the two-dimensional way he had treated cops in the 1973 film Serpico and said that Prince of the City was his way to rectify this depiction. He and Jay Presson Allen wrote a 240-page script in 30 days. The film was budgeted at $10 million, but the director was able to make it for under $8.6 million.

Supposedly, Bruce Willis has a role as a background actor in this film, and Williams tipped him off about The Verdict, Lumet's next film.

Distribution 
Orion opened the film in a select group of theaters to allow time for good reviews and word-of-mouth to build demand ahead of wider release. It could not afford television advertising, and relied heavily on print ads, including an unusual three-page spread in the New York Times.

Reception

Response from subjects 
The film was considered sufficiently authentic by the head of the Drug Enforcement Administration (DEA) that he called Lumet for a copy of the movie to use for the DEA training. Some law-enforcement officials, however, criticized the film for glamorizing Leuci and other corrupt detectives while portraying most of the prosecutors who uncovered the crimes negatively. John Guido, Chief of Inspectional Services, said, "The corrupt guys are the only good guys in the film."

Nicholas Scoppetta, the Special Prosecutor who helped convince Leuci to go undercover against his fellow officers, said, "In the film, it seems to be the prosecutors who are disregarding the issue of where real justice lies and the prosecutors seem to be as bad or worse than the corrupt police." In fact, only two of the five prosecutors the film focuses on were portrayed negatively. In particular, District Attorney Polito, played by James Tolkan, is shown as petty and vindictive. The character is based on Thomas Puccio, the assistant United States Attorney in charge of the Federal Organized Crime Strike Force in Brooklyn, and Robert Daley agrees that he was treated unfairly in the screenplay.

One of the prosecutors who befriended the Ciello character and is shown in a very positive light was based on then rookie federal prosecutor Rudolph Giuliani. The character, Mario Vincente, played by Steve Inwood, is portrayed as threatening to resign if the U.S. Attorney's office indicts Ciello (Leuci) for past transgressions. In general, the prosecutors who argued against the prosecution of Leuci are treated sympathetically, while those who sought his indictment are shown as officious and vindictive.

Critical reception 
Upon its release, Prince of the City garnered mixed reviews, some of which complained about its excessive length, or unfavorably compared Williams' performance to Pacino's in Serpico, Lumet's previous film about police corruption. Roger Ebert of the Chicago Sun-Times called it "a very good movie and, like some of its characters, it wants to break your heart. Maybe it will." Janet Maslin of The New York Times praised its "sharply detailed landscape" and states that its "brief characterizations are so keenly drawn that dozens of them stand out with the forcefulness of major performances." She concludes that it "begins with the strength and confidence of a great film, and ends merely as a good one. The achievement isn't what it first promises to be, but it's exciting and impressive all the same."

The film was not commercially successful in theatres, earning only $8.1 million of its $8.6 million cost. Prince of the City holds a 92% approval rating on Rotten Tomatoes, based on 24 reviews with an average rating of 7.5/10. On Metacritic, it has a score of 81% based on reviews from 15 critics.

Awards and nominations 
 Nominated, Best Adapted Screenplay (Jay Presson Allen, Sidney Lumet), Academy Awards
 Nominated, Best Director (Sidney Lumet), Best Picture, Best Actor (Treat Williams), Golden Globe Awards
 Nominated, Best Picture, Edgar Allan Poe Awards
 Winner, Best Director (Sidney Lumet), Kansas City Film Critics Circle
 Selected, Top Ten Films of the Year, National Board of Review
 Nominated, Best Supporting Actor (Jerry Orbach), National Society of Film Critics
 Winner, Best Director (Sidney Lumet), New York Film Critics Circle
 Nominated, Best Film, Best Screenplay (Jay Presson Allen, Sidney Lumet), Best Supporting Actor (Jerry Orbach), New York Film Critics Circle
 Winner, Best Film, Venice Film Festival
 Nominated, Best Adapted Screenplay (Jay Presson Allen, Sidney Lumet), Writers Guild of America

References

Citations

Other sources 
 Prince of the City: The Real Story (2006), 30-minute making-of featurette on the DVD release

Notes

External links 
 
 
 
 

1981 films
1981 crime drama films
American crime drama films
Films about whistleblowing
Films based on non-fiction books
Crime films based on actual events
American police detective films
Films directed by Sidney Lumet
Orion Pictures films
Films set in New York City
Films set in Virginia
Fictional portrayals of the New York City Police Department
Films about the New York City Police Department
Films shot in New York City
Films shot in New Jersey
Films scored by Paul Chihara
American neo-noir films
Films about police corruption
1980s English-language films
1980s American films